Althorp Park railway station served the area of Althorp Estate in Northamptonshire, England.  The station, which was situated on the Northampton Loop Line, was adjacent to Althorp House, the ancestral seat of the Spencers, the family of Diana, Princess of Wales.

History

Opened by the London and North Western Railway, it joined the London Midland and Scottish Railway during the Grouping of 1923. The line then passed on to the London Midland Region of British Railways on nationalisation in 1948. The station was closed by the British Transport Commission in 1960.

The site today

Trains still pass at speed on the West Coast Main Line, as part of the Northampton Loop Line.

References

External links
 Photograph of Althorp Park station from 1953 - Flickr.com
 Station on navigable 1954 O.S. map

Disused railway stations in Northamptonshire
Former London and North Western Railway stations
Railway stations in Great Britain opened in 1881
Railway stations in Great Britain closed in 1960
1881 establishments in England
West Northamptonshire District